The name Pierre has been used for two tropical cyclones worldwide, both in the Australian region.

 Cyclone Pierre (1985) – paralleled the Queensland coast but only produced minor damage.
 Cyclone Pierre (2007) – an off-season storm which affected Queensland, Papua New Guinea and the Solomon Islands.

Australian region cyclone set index articles